Ivanovka is a rural locality (a khutor) in Svetloyarsky District, Volgograd Oblast, Russia. The population was 998 in 2010. There are 18 streets.

References 

Rural localities in Svetloyarsky District
Tsaritsynsky Uyezd